The 2012 Fuji GT 500km was the second round of the 2012 Super GT season. It took place on May 4, 2012.

Race results

Fuji GT 500km